The Jawbone–Butterbredt Area of Critical Environmental Concern (ACEC), is located in the Mojave Desert and Southern Sierra Nevada, northwest of California City and California State Route 14, in Kern County, California.

An Area of Critical Environmental Concern ACEC is a geographical area within lands administered by the Bureau of Land Management that require special measure to protect sensitive resources such as scenic, cultural or wildlife resource values.
Motor vehicle use within the ACEC is restricted to specific trails and roads.

The area includes the Jawbone OHV Open Area and lies just south of the Scodie Mountains and Kiavah Wilderness Area.

See also
Bright Star Wilderness
Category: Protected areas of the Mojave Desert

External links
Jawbone-Butterbredt Area map – Bureau of Land Management
Jawbone Off-Highway Vehicle Open Area – Bureau of Land Management

Protected areas of the Mojave Desert
Bureau of Land Management areas in California
Sierra Nevada (United States)
Protected areas of Kern County, California